Begum Ishrat Ashraf is a Pakistani politician who has been a member of the National Assembly of Pakistan between 1985 and 2013.

Family
Ashraf is married to Chaudhry Jaffar Iqbal Gujjar and has a daughter Zaib Jaffar and a son Chaudhry Muhammad Omar Jaffar. She is the sister of Zaka Ashraf.

Political career
She was elected to the National Assembly of Pakistan on a seat reserved for women from Punjab in the 1985 Pakistani general election.

She was re-elected to the National Assembly of Pakistan as a candidate of Pakistan Muslim League (N) (PML-N) on a seat reserved for women from Punjab in the 2002 Pakistani general election. In February 2006, she was elected president of PML-N women wing. In June 2006, she became a member of the National Public Safety Commission.

In 2011, she was named among the MPs who had foreign accounts and assets outside Pakistan.

She was re-elected to the National Assembly as a candidate of PML-N on a seat reserved for women from Punjab in the 2008 Pakistani general election.

She was elected to the Provincial Assembly of the Punjab as a candidate of PML-N on a reserved seat for women in 2018 Pakistani general election.

References

Living people
Punjabi people
Punjabi women
Pakistani MNAs 1985–1988
Pakistan Muslim League (N) MNAs
Pakistani MNAs 2002–2007
Women members of the National Assembly of Pakistan
Pakistani MNAs 2008–2013
Punjab MPAs 2018–2023
Pakistan Muslim League (N) MPAs (Punjab)
Women members of the Provincial Assembly of the Punjab
Year of birth missing (living people)
21st-century Pakistani women politicians
People from Rahim Yar Khan District